Badarkha is a village located in Ahmedabad district, in the state of Gujarat, India, which has a population of more than 10,000. It has two main bus stations. 

Employment is largely agricultural. The major population of Rajput like Mandora, Masani, Dayma, Dod, Daya, Vaghela, Gol & some others, like Patel, Ghadhvi, Gajjar & Dalit many others.

References

 Neighbourhoods in Ahmedabad